The North American Interfraternity Conference (or NIC; formerly known as the National Interfraternity Conference) is an association of intercollegiate men's social fraternities that was formally organized in 1910, although it began at a meeting at the University Club in New York City on November 27, 1909. The power of the organization rests in a House of Delegates in which each member fraternity is represented by a single delegate. However, the group's executive and administrative powers are vested in an elected board of directors consisting of nine volunteers from various NIC fraternities. Headquartered in Indianapolis, Indiana, the NIC also operates a small professional staff.

The NIC seeks to provide services that will include, "but not be limited to, promotion of cooperative action in dealing with fraternity matters of mutual concern, research in areas of fraternity operations and procedures, fact-finding and data gathering, and the dissemination of such data to the member fraternities". However, it notes that "[c]onference action shall not in any way abrogate the right of its member fraternities to self-determination".

As of December 2021, the NIC had fifty-six member organizations with 4,000 chapters located on over 800 campuses in the United States and Canada with approximately 350,000 undergraduate members.

Originally named the Interfraternity Conference, the name was changed to the National Interfraternity Conference in 1931. The current name, the North American Interfraternity Conference, was adopted in 1999 to reflect the organization's affiliations at Canadian colleges and universities.

Membership requirements

The NIC membership requirements are detailed in the By-Laws of the North American Interfraternity Conference. Each member fraternity must be national or international in scope, as opposed to local, which is defined to mean having five chapters of ten men each, having three chapters which have been part of the fraternity for at least five years, and have a constitution that calls for national conventions with interim authority vested in a smaller governing body. Further, each fraternity must be exclusive of other NIC members and, therefore, in competition with them for the purposes of recruitment. All members' chapters must exist at four or two-year degree granting colleges. The members agree to share "best practices, statistics and information that will benefit member organizations".

Also, the members agree to uphold universal fraternal ideals, to hold their individual chapters and colonies to their general vision statements, honor NIC resolutions, abide by the NIC Constitution and By-Laws, attend all meetings of the House of Delegates, and pay membership dues.

Each member fraternity must share a wealth of statistical information with the NIC including the number of new members, new member retention, the number of new initiates, total number of initiates, annual retention rate, the number of new chapters and their size, the number of closed chapters and the reason for closure, the total number of active chapters, number of members who are "campus leaders", number of hours of community service completed, and amount of money raised for charitable causes. This information is aggregated, and the raw data is destroyed.

The NIC requires its members to support open expansion on their campuses. It requires that its members are insured and have risk management programs. It imposes a grade requirement on new members and initiated members. It denies members from having women's auxiliary groups. It requires alcohol free recruitment and new member programs, and new member programs are capped at twelve weeks and encouraged to be shorter. Finally, each member must have provisions for the emergency temporary suspension of any of its chapters.

NIC members are required to "communicate its values through its ritual at least annually or as prescribed by its policies."

Mission

The NIC serves to advocate the needs of its member fraternities through enrichment of the fraternity experience; advancement and growth of the fraternity community; and enhancement of the educational mission of the host institutions. The NIC is also committed to enhancing the benefits of fraternity membership. Each of the 75 member organizations has adopted basic expectations of their members and agreed to the following Nine Basic Expectations.

I will know and understand the ideals expressed in my fraternity ritual and will strive to incorporate them in my daily life.
I will strive for academic achievement and practice academic integrity.
I will respect the dignity of all persons; therefore I will not physically, mentally, psychologically or sexually abuse or harm any human being.
I will protect the health and safety of all human beings.
I will respect my property and the property of others; therefore, I will neither abuse nor tolerate the abuse of property.
I will meet my financial obligations in a timely manner.
I will neither use nor support the use of illegal drugs; I will neither misuse nor support the misuse of alcohol.
I acknowledge that a clean and attractive environment is essential to both physical and mental health; therefore, I will do all in my power to see that the chapter property is properly cleaned and maintained.
I will challenge all my fraternity members to abide by these fraternal expectations and will confront those who violate them.

NIC meetings

The NIC is not a governing or regulatory board. It is a voluntary trade association; therefore, it is important that the leadership of the organization gather on a regular basis. This occurs annually at the NIC Congressional Reception and the NIC Annual Meeting.

At the congressional reception, the leadership of the NIC, National Panhellenic Conference (NPC), National Pan-Hellenic Council (NPHC), and the National Association of Latino Fraternal Organizations (NALFO) sponsor a series of meetings and receptions to advance an agenda that is positive toward fraternal organizations. Legislative priorities are determined with current emphasis on the College Fire Prevention Act which authorizes federal funding to upgrade fire safety in college dormitories and fraternity/sorority housing. It is estimated that there is $3.7 billion worth of fraternity housing, most of which is currently not fitted with fire prevention devices such as sprinklers. Other legislative priorities include Freedom of Association, Freedom of Speech, student privacy, and single sex exemptions under Title IX.

Public relations efforts

The North American Interfraternity Conference has conducted research which suggests that to most effectively improve its public perception, high school juniors and seniors should be the primary focus of its public relations campaign. Specifically, the NIC would like to convince these students that their values align with those of the fraternity system before they enter the college environment.

Additionally, the North American Interfraternity Conference believes that fraternity involvement supports the retention and success of college students, and, therefore, that strong partnerships between the fraternity and university community will have a positive effect on both communities. Moreover, they believe that support from the university community is essential to the success on the NIC's public relations initiatives.

Educational programming

Five permanent staff members create learning opportunities for all undergraduate men through a variety of programs, most notably the IFC Academy, Undergraduate Interfraternity Institute (UIFI), IMPACT, Futures Quest, Recruitment Program, Alumni Academy, and the Alcohol Summit. The purpose of the NIC is to promote service, scholarship, the opportunity for self-development, and brotherhood.

The IFC Academy is a one‐day, 14‐hour program, focusing participants on their role in developing high‐performing IFCs – specifically the role of the IFC in serving the needs of its member fraternities, and the role the NIC Standards play in supporting high performance. The program provides IFCs with benchmarks to measure your successes on campus, tools to assess how IFCs should be responding to the needs of its member chapters, and a renewed enthusiasm for advocating for the needs of the fraternity community on its campus.

The Undergraduate Interfraternity Institute (UIFI) is a five-day co-educational program that brings fraternity and sorority leaders together and teaches leadership skills, creates awareness of important issues, and calls on each graduate of the program to lead a change initiative within his/her fraternity/sorority community. The program, begun in 1990, has over 4600 graduates since its inception. In addition, over 120 fraternity/sorority advisors, staff, and volunteers participate each year as facilitators during the program. These facilitators support the work of the NIC staff by leading small group discussions that personalize the experience throughout the institute. St. Jude Children's Research Hospital has become an active partner in the UIFI curriculum by sponsoring the Service component of the curriculum.

IMPACT is a campus based weekend program that brings fraternity and sorority community leaders together to identify a strategy for change and/or improvement to the local fraternal experience. IMPACT is an acronym for Influence, Motivation, Purpose, Action, Commitment, and Trust. These are the five ideals that the curriculum of the program emphasizes. The campus leaders work together during the course of the weekend to identify what needs to change in order to ensure a bright future for the entire community. The staff of the NIC leads these programs throughout the year.

The Jon Williamson Futures Quest brings together the newest members of the fraternity community. In order to participate, these men will have joined a fraternity in the previous year. The curriculum of Futures Quest is designed to allow the participants to begin their fraternal journey in a very positive way and builds an awareness of the vast scope of the opportunities that are available to each of them. During the experience, these men will identify a personal action plan for what he wants to accomplish during his years in college and beyond. The participants leave the program with a feeling of confidence and their self-esteem is affirmed. This in turn positively influences the fraternities as these men assume the leadership positions.

The most important aspect of the fraternal experience may be the need to invite new members to join a fraternity each year. As a result, the NIC offers a program to its members that teaches participants new skills in recruitment and focuses on the positive aspects of membership. The Recruitment Program is one of the most important programs offered by the NIC. Not only does it ensure that membership in fraternities will continue, it also teaches vital skills that each participant can use beyond the fraternal experience. The program makes the direct statement, "If you want to recruit me, then you better have a plan." The goal of the program is that every participant has a plan of action for their recruitment goals.

Programs are offered for alumni members of fraternities as well. Vital to the success of the undergraduate chapters, is the importance of having chapter advisors and alumni mentors. The Alumni Academy is an opportunity for alumni members of fraternities to identify ways to serve the fraternity as a chapter advisor, house corporation member, and/or mentor. In addition, the alumni are re-educated about the purpose of fraternity in the lives of young men and the newer aspects of the fraternity experience in today's society. Finally, the academy forms a community from among the alumni boards that are on each campus. It brings together the alumni role models, getting them to solve campus issues while recognizing the effectiveness of teamwork.

The NIC is always seeking ways in which it may develop new initiatives to enhance the work of its member organizations. In 2000, the NIC received a $750,000 cooperative grant from the National Highway Traffic Safety Administration. This signaled the beginning of efforts to reach into the college community and have students determine the best course of action to take to deal with the number one issue on college campuses - alcohol. The Alcohol Summit is designed to bring together a coalition of students to discuss alcohol issues and create lasting outcomes to address the effects of alcohol and high risk drinking behaviors.

Affiliate organizations
 Largest average chapter size: Beta Theta Pi: 76
 Most undergraduate members: Sigma Chi: 15,700
 Most initiates: Sigma Chi: 350,000+
 Most active collegiate chapters: Alpha Phi Alpha: 354
 Most collegiate charters granted: Alpha Phi Alpha: 414

Current members

At one time, the National Interfraternity Conferences separated its members into those with Junior membership and those with Senior membership. In addition to the fraternities own websites, chapter information is available at the Baird's Manual Archive Online.

Active Former members
Several of the historically large fraternities are no longer members of the NIC. In December 2002, Kappa Sigma (December 9), Phi Delta Theta (December 9), and Phi Sigma Kappa, withdrew their membership in the NIC due to disagreements with the strategic direction of the organization. Phi Sigma Kappa rejoined the NIC in 2006. On October 27, 2015, Lambda Chi Alpha resigned its membership, stating: "Unfortunately, the NIC has recently elected to pursue counterproductive tactics that we believe are antithetical to our values and we cannot support them." On January 14, 2016, Tau Kappa Epsilon announced that it had resigned its membership effective immediately, citing an extreme increase in cost resulting from the NIC 2.0 initiative and the obligation to ensure every member dollar is spent wisely. 
On January 24, 2017, Delta Epsilon Psi resigned to focus efforts on National APIDA Panhellenic Association (NAPA), and the Panhellenic Association. Sigma Phi Epsilon announced its resignation on November 7, 2019, citing that "SigEp’s vision for how to enhance health and safety in the fraternity experience and partner with our host institutions has diverged from the NIC’s current approach." 
In May 2020, five fraternities - Alpha Epsilon Pi, Alpha Sigma Phi, Alpha Tau Omega, Kappa Alpha Order, and Theta Chi - established the Fraternity Forward Coalition (FFC). Alpha Epsilon Pi, Alpha Sigma Phi, and Theta Chi have since not renewed membership in the NIC, leaving Alpha Tau Omega as the sole member of both the NIC and FFC. Gordy Heminger, a coalition organizer, stated, “We look forward to partnering with the North American Interfraternity Conference (NIC)
and other similar organizations advocating on behalf of fraternities,” in the FFC announcement.

Defunct Former Members
In addition, several fraternities in the NIC have merged with other members of the NIC and thus no longer have been counted as members or have gone defunct. Chapter and merger information may also be found at the Baird's Manual Archive Online.

See also
 List of hazing deaths in the United States
 Fraternity and Sorority Political Action Committee
North American fraternity and sorority housing

References

Further reading
 A Diamond Jubilee History of The National Interfraternity Conference: 75 Glorious Years by Jack L. Anson, 1984

External links
 Official North American Interfraternity Conference website

 
Greek letter umbrella organizations
Trade associations based in the United States
International student societies
Student organizations established in 1909
Student societies in the United States
1909 establishments in New York City
Non-profit organizations based in Indianapolis